Uromastyx aegyptia is a species of lizard in the family Agamidae. The species is endemic to North Africa and the Middle East.

Common names
Common names for U. aegyptia include Egyptian mastigure, Egyptian spiny-tailed lizard, and, when referring to the subspecies Uromastyx aegyptia leptieni (see below), Leptien's mastigure.

Description

Geographic range and conservation status
U. aegyptia can be found in Egypt east of the Nile, Israel, Syria, Jordan, the Arabian Peninsula, Iraq, and Iran. It has a patchy distribution and is rare in most parts of its range. It is believed to be in decline because of habitat loss and over-harvesting.

Subspecies
Three subspecies are recognized as being valid, including the nominotypical subspecies.
Uromastyx aegyptia aegyptia 
Uromastyx aegyptia leptieni 
Uromastyx aegyptia microlepis

Etymology
The subspecific name, leptieni, is in honor of German herpetologist Rolf Leptien.

Economic use
U. aegyptia is locally known as dhab or ḍabb. Its strong skin made good leather for the bedouins, while its meat was often considered as an alternative source of protein.

Habitat

References

Further reading
Forskål P (1775). Descriptiones Animalium, Avium, Amphibiorum, Piscium, Insectorum, Vermium; quæ in Itinere Orientali Observit. Copenhagen: Möller. 164 pp. (Lacerta ægyptia, new species, p. 13). (in Latin).

External links
Egyptian Spiny-Tail Agama, Sea Dwellers & Friends.

aegyptia
Agamid lizards of Africa
Vertebrates of Egypt
Reptiles of the Arabian Peninsula
Reptiles of the Middle East
Reptiles of Iran
Reptiles of Iraq
Reptiles of Jordan
Reptiles of Syria
Reptiles described in 1775
Taxa named by Peter Forsskål